The Swinger is an album by trumpeter Harry Edison which was recorded in 1958 and released on the Verve label.

Reception

The Allmusic review by Ron Wynn stated "Both torrid and mellow – this is striking Edison".

Track listing 
All compositions by Harry Edison except where noted.
 "Pussy Willow" – 7:30
 "The Very Thought of You" (Ray Noble) – 6:03
 "Nasty" – 4:53
 "The Strollers" – 6:52
 "Sunday" (Chester Conn, Jule Styne, Bennie Krueger, Ned Miller) – 6:53
 "Fair Ground" – 4:53

Personnel 
Harry Edison – trumpet
Jimmy Forrest – tenor saxophone
Jimmy Jones – piano
Freddie Green – guitar
Joe Benjamin – bass
Charlie Persip – drums

References 

1958 albums
Harry Edison albums
Verve Records albums
Albums produced by Norman Granz